Plesioteuthididae is an extinct family of squid.

References

External links 
 TONMO Forums: Plesioteuthis
 Morphology, feeding habits and phylogenic implications of the Cretaceous coleoid Dorateuthis syriaca

Prehistoric cephalopod families
Squid
Taxa named by Adolf Naef